Allen Rucker (born September 26, 1945) is an American writer and author. Born in Wichita Falls, Texas, and raised in Bartlesville, Oklahoma,  he earned a B.A. from Washington University in St. Louis (1967), an M.A. in American Culture from the University of Michigan (1969), and another M.A. in Communication from Stanford University (1977).

Career 
He co-founded the video documentary group TVTV, co-wrote (with Martin Mull) the award-winning cable series The History of White People in America, and wrote the Emmy Award-winning documentary "Two Days in October" for the PBS series American Experience. His nine books to date include three books on the TV series The Sopranos, including The New York Times bestseller The Sopranos Family Cookbook, and a memoir about becoming paralyzed due to transverse myelitis at the age of 50: The Best Seat In The House: How I Woke Up One Tuesday and Was Paralyzed For Life.

He has also co-written books with Martin Mull, country star Gretchen Wilson, and the book Hollywood Causes Cancer with comedian Tom Green.

Personal life
Rucker lives in Los Angeles and is married with two sons. He also teaches in the School of Cinematic Arts at the University of Southern California.

References

External links

21st-century American novelists
American male novelists
American television writers
American male television writers
Television producers from California
People with paraplegia
Washington University in St. Louis alumni
University of Michigan alumni
Stanford University alumni
University of Southern California faculty
1945 births
People from Wichita Falls, Texas
People from Bartlesville, Oklahoma
Writers from Los Angeles
Living people
American male screenwriters
Screenwriters from California
Television producers from Texas
Screenwriters from Texas
21st-century American male writers